

The Dewoitine D.21 was 1920s French open-cockpit, fixed-undercarriage monoplane fighter aircraft.

Design and development
The prototype D.21 was a development of the D.12. The aircraft was license-built in Switzerland (by EKW), Czechoslovakia (by Skoda and known as the Skoda-Dewoitine D.1) and Argentina (by FMA). One Turkish D.21 was fitted with a modified wing and named Orhanelli.

Operational history
Argentina bought seven French-built D.21s, and built another 38 under license by FMA from 1929 to 1932. The type remained in service until 1941. Turkey bought a number, and Czechoslovakia built 25 for their air force.

Variants
D.21 C.1French Production version, license-built in Argentina and Turkey.
Skoda D.1Licence manufacture of the Dewoitine D.21 in Czechoslovakia by Skoda;(26 built - included in D.9 total). Škoda L was a licence-built Hispanio Suiza HS-50. Armament only 2 ×  Vickers machine-guns

Operators

Army Aviation Service
Argentine Naval Aviation

Paraguayan Air Force

Turkish Air Force

Specifications (D.21 C.1)

See also

References

Bibliography

  

 

1920s French fighter aircraft
D.021
Parasol-wing aircraft
Single-engined tractor aircraft
Aircraft first flown in 1925